The 2010 Segunda División season was the 65th edition of the second tier of Federación Peruana de Futbol. There were 10 teams in league play. The champion, Cobresol, was promoted to the 2011 Peruvian First Division. The last place, Tecnológico, was relegated to Copa Perú. The tournament was played on a home-and-away round-robin basis.

In February 2010, IDUNSA signed a strategic alliance with the club Carlos A. Mannucci, by the product of this "strategic alliance" IDUNSA will pass to be called Carlos Mannucci and light up the classical colors of the tricolor. Weeks later, the alliance was canceled due to that the ADFP-SD did not accept the change of headquarters.

On May 28, 2010, IDUNSA and Sport Águila withdrew before the start of the season.

Teams

Table

Standings

Results

Top goalscorers
13 goals
 Juan Luna (Hijos de Acosvinchos)
 Ramón Rodriguez (Cobresol)
9 goals
 Jair Gonzales (Hijos de Acosvinchos)
 Danfer Doy (Atlético Minero)
7 goals
 Cesar Goya (Atlético Minero)
 Gustavo Stagnaro (Coronel Bolognesi)
 Juan Montenegro (Sport Áncash)
6 goals
 Roberto Dolorier (Universidad San Marcos)
 Natalio Portillo (Sport Áncash)
5 goals
 Lionel Arguedas (Atlético Minero)
 Hector Rojas (Cobresol)

References

External links
 RSSSF

2
2010